Siege of Almería may refer to:

Siege of Almería (1147), successful siege by León–Castile and allies
Siege of Almería (1309), unsuccessful siege by Castile and Aragon

es:Sitio de Almería